Ghulam Farooq Awan (born 10 February 1961), is a Pakistani lawyer and columnist, and former adviser to the Prime Minister of Pakistan for law, justice and parliamentary affairs. He previously also served as additional Attorney General of Pakistan.

Political career 
He joined the legal practice in 1991 and has spent over 20 years as a lawyer. He became the additional Attorney General of Pakistan on 4 January 2011 and was appointed as the Adviser to the Prime Minister, Yousuf Raza Gillani on 16 April 2011 by President of Pakistan, Asif Zardari.
He later left Pakistan People's Party and joined the Pakistan Tehreek-i-Insaf in 2016.

References 

People from Rawalpindi District
Punjabi people
Living people
1961 births
Pakistani lawyers
Attorneys General of Pakistan